Parapercis roseoviridis is a fish species in the sandperch family, Pinguipedidae. It is found in Hawaii. This species can reach a length of  TL.

References

Pinguipedidae
Taxa named by Charles Henry Gilbert
Fish described in 1905
Fish of Hawaii